Carmel Monon Depot, also known as Monon Depot Museum, is a historic train station located at Carmel, Hamilton County, Indiana. It has a gable roof with wide overhanging eaves. It originally served as a passenger station and freight depot until services were discontinued in 1961 and 1974, respectively. It was moved to its present location in 1980, and in 1981 a  addition was constructed. The building was subsequently renovated and houses a local history museum.

It was listed on the National Register of Historic Places in 2013.

References

History museums in Indiana
Railway stations on the National Register of Historic Places in Indiana
Railway stations in the United States opened in 1883
Victorian architecture in Indiana
Former Monon Railroad stations
National Register of Historic Places in Hamilton County, Indiana
Transportation buildings and structures in Hamilton County, Indiana
Railway stations closed in 1974
Former railway stations in Indiana